Eniola Badmus (born 7 September 1982) is a Nigerian professional film actress, script writer, entertainer and a social media influencer.

She came into the limelight in 2008 after she was featured in the movie Jenifa.

Early life and education
Badmus was born in Ijebu Ode, Nigeria she had her basic and secondary school education in Ijebu Ode She proceeded to the University of Ibadan where she studied Theatre Arts and then Lagos State University where she graduated with an M.Sc degree in economics.

Career
Badmus' career in acting professional started in the year 2000 but came into limelight in 2008 when she shot to recognition starring in two Yoruba films titled Jenifa and Omo Ghetto. Both movies are instrumental to her rise in the Nigeria entertainment industry which has since seen her star as both lead and supporting actress in several Yoruba and English films.

Filmography

Selected filmography

Jenifa
Angelina
Village Babes
Oreke Temi
Blackberry Babes
Mr. & Mrs Ibu
Wicked Step-mother
Child Seller
Adun Ewuro
Visa Lottery 
Ojukwu the War Lord
Police Academy 
Not My Queen
Battle for Justice
Miss Fashion
Eefa
Omo Esu
 Black Val
 GhettoBred
 Househelp
 Karma
 Big Offer
 Jenifa
 Omo-Ghetto
 Daluchi
 Funke
 Miracle
 The-Spell
 Oshaprapra
 Omo ghetto the saga
Akpe: Return of the Beast
One Lagos Night
Swallow

Endorsement deal 
In March 2016, Eniola was unveiled as a brand ambassador for telecommunication company Etisalat.
She has also served as brand ambassador for Western Lotto, Indomie, and Peak milk.

Awards and nominations

Best movie actress city people 2017
Best actress 2018 (Plus size African fashion week)

See also
List of Yoruba people

References

External links

Living people
21st-century Nigerian actresses
Yoruba actresses
Actresses from Ogun State
Yoruba radio personalities
University of Ibadan alumni
Lagos State University alumni
Nigerian radio personalities
Actresses in Yoruba cinema
People from Ijebu Ode
1983 births
Nigerian film actresses
Nigerian screenwriters
Nigerian film award winners